Sahlingia may refer to:
 Sahlingia (gastropod), a mollusc genus
 Sahlingia (alga), a red alga genus in the family Erythrotrichiaceae